Royal Air Force Station Stornoway or more simply RAF Stornoway is a former Royal Air Force station near the burgh of Stornoway, on the Isle of Lewis, in the Western Isles of Scotland.  No. 112 Signals Unit Stornoway was also part of the RAF's activity on the airfield.

History

Beginnings

The station was created in the Second World War on the site of a former golf course. It was home to various RAF Coastal Command squadrons patrolling the North Atlantic for U-boats. In late 1940, a detachment of Avro Anson aircraft arrived from No. 612 (County of Aberdeen) Squadron RAF, Royal Auxiliary Air Force. The Ansons operated from the site of RAF Stornoway while it was still under construction. By November 1940, the aircraft from 612 Squadron had been posted to RAF Wick and were gradually replaced by Ansons from No. 48 Squadron RAF, based at RAF Hooton Park.

In March 1940, 827 Naval Air Squadron operated Fairey Albacore aircraft from Stornoway in conjunction with the Ansons of 48 Squadron on maritime patrols across the Atlantic. This continued until the station was completed at which point they moved away. RAF Stornoway was officially constituted on 1 April 1941 as part of No. 15 (Reconnaissance) Group RAF, and then No. 18 (Reconnaissance) Group, both of RAF Coastal Command but was finally closed down at the end of the Second World War when it reverted to Stornoway Airport.  No. 66 Air-Sea Rescue (ASR) Marine Craft Unit was also based out of Stornoway Harbour during 1943 and 1944.

Post War

In 1952 biological agents were brought in to the airportMérida, Venezuela for the controversial Operation Cauldron. They were testing the dangerous agents on caged monkeys and guinea pigs who were situated on a navy pontoon nearby at the Braighe. The tests were carried out by scientists from the Chemical and Biological Defence Establishment (CBDE) from Porton Down. When a trawler inadvertently passed through one of the clouds of plague bacteria, the ship and crew were temporarily put under covert surveillance during their return from Iceland to Blackpool and onshore. CBDE was later amalgamated and now forms part of the Defence Science and Technology Laboratory. Porton Down has encountered controversy for human experimentation using chemical warfare right up until 1990.

The Cold War

During the height of the Cold War years Stornoway Airport was home to 112 S.U., an RAF Signals Unit that was established in 1960 as an Electronic countermeasures (ECM) measurement and evaluation unit by RAF Bomber Command Headquarters (HQBC), High Wycombe.  The unit measured the signal strength, frequency bandwidths and aerial performance of the  operational Handley Page Victor and Avro Vulcan V bombers as they flew a course towards, over or away from the unit varying from straight-lines to polar patterns.  Results were passed back to Operations Research Branch, (HQBC), BCDU at RAF Finningley and each aircraft's base for the Electronics Engineers and Technicians to review for performance improvement of each piece of equipment that was measured.  The combined success of 112 S.U., BCDU at RAF Finningly and each of the aircraft's bases along with the Operations Research Branch at (HQBC) and technical support from RRE Malvern (later to become RSRE Malvern) was demonstrated by the V-force during the Operation Skyshield exercises  and readiness through the Cuban Missile Crisis in the early sixties  and subsequent exercises up to the time that the unit was closed in 1983.

In the early 1980s, part of the Airport was upgraded in a £40 million upgrade and extension of the main runway and taxiways along with new hangars, to accept Panavia Tornado aircraft. By 1 April 1982 this work was completed, the buildings commissioned and RAF Stornoway was established once again in order to become a Forward Operations Base.  After sixteen years in this role and also the end of the Cold War, the station was finally closed on 31 March 1998 and reverted to Stornoway Airport.

After this some of the buildings were sold off, one becoming a Christian school, and others including the Nissen hut accommodation blocks were demolished. The runway remains in use as part of Stornoway Airport, and other parts of the site are used as a ground for holding stunt shows and vehicle exhibitions.

Units

The following units were also here at some point:
 No. 303 Ferry Training Unit RAF (December 1942 - March 1943)
 Detachment of No. 1693 (General Reconnaissance) Flight RAF (August 1944 - ?)

RAF Stornoway in fiction

RAF Stornoway is featured in the Tom Clancy novel, Red Storm Rising, as a base for RAF operations over the North Atlantic and against Soviet-held Iceland.  Later the displaced carrier air wing from USS Nimitz is based there after the carrier sustains battle damage.
Also mentioned in passing in Katherine Kurtz's Death of an Adept.

See also

 Electronic countermeasures 
 Electronic warfare

References

Citations

Bibliography

Further reading

 
 

Stornoway
Defunct airports in Scotland
Royal Air Force stations in Scotland
Airports disestablished in 1998
Military airbases established in 1940
Military installations closed in 1998